Louis Claude de Saulces de Freycinet (7 August 1779 – 18 August 1841) was a French Navy officer. He circumnavigated the earth, and in 1811 published the first map to show a full outline of the coastline of Australia.

Biography
He was born at Montélimar, Drôme. Louis-Claude de Saulces de Freycinet was his full name (many calling him Louis de Freycinet). He had three brothers, Louis-Henri de Saulces de Freycinet, André-Charles de Saulces de Freycinet and the youngest, Frédéric-Casimir de Saulces de Freycinet (father of Charles de Freycinet). Louis-Claude was the second oldest.

In 1793 he joined the French Navy as a midshipman, and took in several engagements against the British. In 1800, Freycinet was appointed to an exploration expedition to Southern and South-Western coasts of Australia under Nicolas Baudin, on Naturaliste and Géographe. Freycinet's brother, Louis-Henri de Freycinet, was also part of the expedition.

Between September 1802 and August 1803, Freycinet captained the schooner Casuarina, surveying the Australian coastline. He then transferred to Naturaliste, and returned to France in 1804.

Because Matthew Flinders was being held  captive by the French on Mauritius, many of his discoveries were revisited and unintendedly claimed by François Péron, and new names were given by this expedition; in 1824 it was remedied in the second edition of Voyage découvertes aux terres australes. In the end, Baudin and Freycinet managed to have their map of the Australian coastline published in 1811, three years before Flinders published his. An inlet on the coast of Western Australia is called Freycinet Estuary. Cape Freycinet between Cape Leeuwin and Cape Naturaliste and the Freycinet Peninsula with Freycinet National Park in Tasmania also bear the explorer's name.

In 1805, he returned to Paris, and was entrusted by the government with the work of preparing the maps and plans of the expedition.  He also completed the narrative, and the whole work appeared under the title of Voyage de découvertes aux terres australes (Paris, 1807–1816).

The plant genus Freycinetia (Pandanaceae) was named in his honor, as was the Hawaiian native tree/shrub Santalum freycinetianum.

Circumnavigation on Uranie

In 1817, he was given command of the corvette Uranie, especially reconfigured to a new exploration voyage. Uranie carried several members of the Navy scientific staff, notably marine hydrologist Louis Isidore Duperrey, artist Jacques Arago, and his junior draughtsman Adrien Taunay the Younger.

Uranie sailed to Rio de Janeiro to take a series of pendulum measurements gather information in the fields of geography, ethnology, astronomy, terrestrial magnetism, meteorology, and for collecting specimens in natural history. Freycinet also managed to sneak his wife Rose de Freycinet aboard.

For three years, Freycinet cruised about the Pacific, visiting Australia, the Mariana Islands, Hawaiian Islands, and other Pacific islands, South America, and other places, and, notwithstanding the loss of Uranie on the Falkland Islands during the return voyage, returned to France with fine collections in all departments of natural history, and with voluminous notes and drawings of the countries visited.

The results of this voyage were published under Freycinet's supervision, with the title of Voyage autour du monde fait par ordre du Roi sur les corvettes de S. M. l'Uranie et la Physicienne, pendant les années 1817, 1818, 1819 et 1820, in 13 quarto volumes and 4 folio volumes of plates and maps.

Freycinet was admitted into the French Academy of Sciences in 1825, and was one of the founders of the Paris Geographical Society. He died at the family's château de Freycinet near Saulce-sur-Rhône, Drôme.

Journals of the Voyage 1817-1820
Vol. 1 Part 1:  Book I France to Brazil. pub.1827.
Vol. 1 Part 2: Book II Brazil to Timor. pub.1828.
Vol. 2 Part 1: Book III Timor to the Marianas. pub.1829.
Vol. 2 Part 2: Book IV Guam to Hawaii; Book V Hawaii to Port Jackson 1819. pub.1829.
Vol. 2 Part 3: Book V Hawaii to Port Jackson; Book VI Port Jackson to France 1820. pub.1839.
Zoology. pub.1824.
Zoology Plates. pub.1824.
Botany. pub.1826.
Botany Plates. pub.1826.
Navigation and Hydrography, Part 1. pub.1826.
Navigation and Hydrography, Part 2. pub.1826.
Pendulum Observations. pub.1826.
Terrestrial Magnetism. pub.1842.
Meteorology. pub.1844.

See also
 European and American voyages of scientific exploration
Freycinet Map of 1811

Taxa named in his honor 
The Indonesian speckled carpetshark, Hemiscyllium freycineti is named after him.
Freycinetia (Pandanaceae)

Notes and references
Notes

References

Bibliography

Edward Duyker François Péron: An Impetuous Life: Naturalist and Voyager, Miegunyah/MUP, Melb., 2006,
 Fornasiero, Jean; Monteath, Peter and West-Sooby, John.  Encountering Terra Australis: the Australian voyages of Nicholas Baudin and Matthew Flinders, Kent Town, South Australia, Wakefield Press, 2004. 
Frank Horner, The French Reconnaissance: Baudin in Australia 1801–1803, Melbourne University Press, Melbourne, 1987 .
 Marchant, Leslie R. French Napoleonic Placenames of the South West Coast, Greenwood, WA. R.I.C. Publications, 2004.  
 Hordern House, Captain Louis de Freycinet and his Voyages to the Terres Australes, Hordern House, Sydney, 2011 
 Rose de Freycinet (patronymic Pinon) and Federico Motta, curator, Rose de Freycinet. Una viaggiatrice clandestina a bordo dell'Uranie negli anni 1817-20, Verona, Giugno 2017. Translation of Rose original Journal, fully annotated with new documents and with a comprehensive revision of Louis de Freycinet travel, 
 
 Rare Freycinet map. Ile Decrès, or Kangaroo Island, 1803, held by the Royal Geographical Society of South Australia 

1779 births
1841 deaths
People from Montélimar
French explorers
French explorers of the Pacific
Explorers of Western Australia
Members of the French Academy of Sciences
French military personnel of the Napoleonic Wars
French military personnel of the French Revolutionary Wars